Hot Wheels: Beat That! is a racing video game released in September 2007 and based on the Hot Wheels toy line that was manufactured by Mattel. The game was developed by Eutechnyx and published by Activision.

Gameplay 
The game features 3 events of racing in single player, 31 authentically modeled vehicles and 2 unplayable vehicles, two-player gameplay, competitive weaponry and power-ups. The player proceeds to race through a bedroom, mini golf, attic and a bowling alley. New events and cars can be unlocked by winning an event or achieving the 2 secondary goals for each event.

Reception 

The DS, Wii and PlayStation 2 versions received mixed reviews, while the PC and Xbox 360 versions received "unfavorable" reviews, according to video game review aggregator Metacritic.

Notes

References

External links 
 

2007 video games
Eutechnyx games
Activision games
Hot Wheels video games
Nintendo DS games
PlayStation 2 games
Racing video games
Video games based on toys
Video games developed in Hungary
Video games developed in the United Kingdom
Wii games
Windows games
Xbox 360 games
Multiplayer and single-player video games
Vehicular combat games